The women's 800 metres at the 2007 World Championships in Athletics was held at the Nagai Stadium on 25, 26  and 28 August.

Medalists

Schedule

Results

Heats
Qualification: First 3 in each heat(Q) and the next 6 fastest(q) advance to the semifinals.

Semifinals
Qualification: First 2 in each semifinal (Q) and the next 2 fastest (q) advance to the final.

Final

References
General
Results

800 metres
800 metres at the World Athletics Championships
2007 in women's athletics